The Society of Mary abbreviated SM is a clerical religious congregation of Pontifical Right for men (brothers and priests) commonly called the Marianists or Marianist Brothers and Priests. Its members add the nominal letters "'S.M.'" to their names to indicate their membership in the Society. The Society was founded by William Joseph Chaminade, a priest who survived the anti-clerical persecution during the French Revolution. The Society is one of the four branches of the Marianist Family. Along with the other branches, the Marianist Brothers and Priests look to Mary as a model of faith and spirituality. They believe that the best ways to live a spiritual life are to share their faith with others, work with the poor, and educate and nourish the mind, the body, and the soul.

Marianists around the world
There are about 1,200 Marianists: 405 priests, two bishops, and 800 brothers on four continents and 38 countries. The Marianists say that they "devote the major part of their efforts to inculturation to become rooted in new countries, in Asia and Africa, and also to be in tune with the surrounding cultures that challenge us and that we call modern or postmodern."

Formation process 

Men who pursue a vocation with the Society of Mary follow an intense formation process that leads them to examine themselves and their spirituality. The first step to becoming a Marianist is to be a Contact. Contacts learn about the religious institute and themselves through retreats and the guidance of a Marianist whom they contact regularly.  The next step is Aspirancy – a 10-month journey of living with a Marianist community and following its daily practices.  Each aspirant works in a ministry to further understand Marianist spirituality and faith. At the end of this period, one enters the Novitiate, a 20-month period divided over two years.  During that time, the novice learns about the institute and spends time deeply discerning his call to the institute.

At the end of the Novitiate, the novice professes Temporary Vows.  He must annually renew the vows for at least three years. At the end of that time, the brother can decide to enter into Perpetual Profession. The brother professes the vows of poverty, chastity, obedience, and stability.  In addition, some brothers study to become priests at the International Marianist Seminary in Rome, Italy.

Marianists in North America

Canada
The Marianists are active in Canada, where the late Archbishop Raymond Roussin, S.M., D.D., one of their number, was head of the archiepiscopal see of Vancouver from 2004 to 2009.

United States
The United States is home to two Marianist provinces: the Province of the United States and the Province of Meribah.

The Province of Meribah, which became separate in 1976, operates only in the Diocese of Rockville Centre on Long Island, New York. There it runs an educational complex: Chaminade High School, Kellenberg Memorial High School (including the Bro. Joseph C. Fox Latin School Division, for grades 6–8); and St. Martin de Porres Marianist School (pre-kindergarten through grade 8). It also runs five retreat houses: Emmanuel Retreat House (on Kellenberg property), Stella Maris Retreat House (East Islip, NY), Saragossa (on Chaminade property), Meribah (Muttontown, New York), and Founder's Hollow (Accord, New York). The Provincial of the Province of Meribah is Brother Timothy S. Driscoll, S.M. Since the Province of Meribah was created, it has maintained in common the life of prayer, the educational apostolate, and religious garb.  The brothers' motto is Servire Quam Sentire (serve with feeling).

The Province of the United States recently updated their mission statement as follows: 
Empowered by the Holy Spirit and inspired by the dynamism of Blessed Chaminade's charism, we – brothers and priests – vowed religious in the Marianist Family, live in community as equals.  Through lives of prayer and Gospel service, we dedicate ourselves to the following of Jesus Christ, Son of God become Son of Mary.  Wherever we are sent we invite others to share Mary's Mission of making Christ present in every age and culture by forming persons and communities of apostolic faith that advance justice and reconciliation. Committed to education, we minister with youth and in solidarity with the poor.

Members of the Marianist Province of the United States are concentrated in Honolulu, Hawaii; St. Louis, Missouri; Dayton, Ohio; Cincinnati, Ohio; San Antonio, Texas; and Omaha, Nebraska. The Province runs three universities (the University of Dayton in Dayton, Ohio; St. Mary's University in San Antonio, Texas; and Chaminade University in Honolulu, Hawaii), 18 high schools, 6 elementary schools, 2 middle schools, 5 retreat centers, and 7 parishes. Charles J. Pedersen, 1987 Nobel laureate in chemistry, attended a Marianist high school, and thence chose to attend the Marianist University of Dayton.

Marianists in Europe

France
The Marianists remain active in France, where they were first founded.  The Society's Province of France includes 112 brothers and priests in 17 "houses," or community residences, in France, Belgium, and Tunisia.  Fifty-eight are posted to the Ivory Coast and Congo region. Within the French Province, the Marianists operate eight schools.  They also run three spiritual centers (at La Madeleine, St. Avold, and Le Vic), two residences for university students, and an extensive scholarship program for Marianist schools.  In addition, they serve in youth ministry, pastoral work, and hospital chaplaincy.

Italy
The Marianists' world headquarters is in Rome, Italy.

Ireland
In 1967, Archbishop John Charles McQuaid of Dublin invited Marianists from the United States to establish a mission in Ireland.  Still part of the Province of the United States, the Irish Marianists operate St. Laurence College in Loughlinstown, Dún Laoghaire–Rathdown. They have also been active in diocesan youth ministry, school and prison chaplaincy, drug rehabilitation, work for peace and justice, and parish work.  Four Irish Catholics have permanently joined the religious institute since 1976.

Spain
They came to Spain in 1830. In 1977, the Marianists in Spain established the Santa Maria Foundation, which publishes Marianist Editions and organizes pedagogical programs. They operate the Colegio del Pilar in Madrid, the Santa Ana y San Rafael, and 15 more schools, some of which are considered among the best in Spain.

Switzerland
Fr. François Kieffer, a French Marianist priest, established the Villa St. Jean International School in Fribourg, Switzerland, in 1903, which operated until 1970.

Marianists in Latin America

Argentina 
The Marianists arrived from Spain in 1932 and founded a school in Buenos Aires in the neighborhood of Caballito in 1935. It is still located there. They also have a presence in Junín and Nueve de Julio in Buenos Aires province, and in General Roca, Río Negro province.

Chile
The Marianists have been active in Chile since 1948, invited by Cardinal Jose Maria Caro. In 1982, the institute formed the Province of Chile and the Province of Argentina by dividing the Province of the Andes.  The Marianists' educational institutions in Chile include Colegio Santa María de la Cordillera, Colegio Parroquial San Miguel, Instituto Miguel León Prado, and Instituto Linares.

Peru
The Marianists have founded various educational institutions such as Colegio Santa Maria Marianistas, Colegio Maria Reina Marianistas,en 1965, Colegio San Antonio Marianistas, Colegio San José Obrero Marianistas, and El Instituto Chaminade Marianistas.

Puerto Rico
The Marianists have been active in Puerto Rico since 1938 when Colegio San José was founded and is among the leading college preparatory schools of Puerto Rico and the Caribbean.

Marianists in Africa
Marianists came to Africa as missionaries in 1946.  They are active in Kenya, Malawi, Zambia, Republic of the Congo, Democratic Republic of the Congo, Ivory Coast, Togo, and Tunisia.

Kenya
The Marianists operate Our Lady of Nazareth primary school and the IMANI counseling,Ujamaa Family Centre, Job Creation training Program, and child care center in Nairobi, and the Marianist Development Project, a similar institution, in Mombasa.  They serve members of the Sudanese Diocese of Rumbec in northwest Kenya.  They operate the St. Bakhita Formation Center, with a seminary and training schools for nurses, teachers, and catechists. In 1925, they founded the prestigious Mang'u High School in Kenya.

Malawi
The Marianists' projects are the Chaminade Secondary School and MIRACLE, a rural job-training service for youths orphaned by AIDS.

Zambia
The Marianists teach at Matero Boys Secondary School, reach out to the school's alumni, and help the surrounding diocese by celebrating Mass with their neighbors.

Marianists in Asia and Australasia

Philippines
The Marianists arrived in the Philippines in 2004. The congregation chose the more Islamic, southern part of the Philippines in the big city of Davao City as their mission area to establish a presence.

Beginnings
Brother Richard Joyal, a member of the Marianist Region of Canada, was sent by the Marianist General Administration to research a possible foundation in the Philippines. He arrived in Manila on January 22, 2004, and spent several months visiting Bishops and religious communities. In July, Richard attended the International Meeting for Marianist Formators held in Nairobi, Kenya (June 13 – July 11, 2004).

Based on his reports, the General Administration decided to establish the first Marianist religious community  on the island of Mindanao, in Davao City.

The community in Davao City was formed on October 2, 2004, by the arrival of Bros. Oscar Kerketta and Victor Sahayaraj from India, Fr. Pablo Rambaud from Spain, and Bro. Richard Joyal from Canada.

Ministries
Fr. Pat Devlin SM (Marist Fathers) had begun caring for Filipino Street Children on May 4, 1989. Fr. Pat worked with Caritas of the Archdiocese of Davao until the program registered with the Securities and Exchange Commission (SEC) as the "Foundation of Balay Pasilungan, Inc." From 1999 to 2005, the center was turned over to the Marist Sisters, who worked with Filipino Street Children up to fifteen.

In 2005 The Marianists in Davao adopted Balay Pasilungan as their Community apostolate. The center is accredited and is licensed to operate from the Department of Social Welfare and Development (DSWD). In 2006 the executive Director was Brother Richard Joyal; the Deputy Director was Father Pablo Rambaud with assistant Bro. Oscar Kerketta.

Japan
Marianists sent five expatriates to Japan in 1887, and in 1888 established a mission school, Gyosei Gakuen in Tokyo.  They also established Kaisei Gakuen in Nagasaki in 1891, Osaka Meisei Gakuen in Osaka in 1898, and St. Joseph School in Yokohama in 1901.

Australia
The local parish priests of the western suburbs of Melbourne, Victoria, purchased a large block of 8 hectares in Altona that was transformed into the setting for St Paul's by the parents of the first students. The main 3-story classroom block was completed in 1969.

The Marianists conducted the College for twenty years, under Headmasters Brother John McCluskey, Brother William Callahan, Father Daniel Winters, and Brother Donald McCoy. In 1985 the first lay principal, Mr. Christopher Dean, was appointed. In 1997 Mr. Christopher Stock was appointed principal.
 
Some specialist buildings at St Paul's campus have been named in recognition of the proud Marianist tradition of the College: Chaminade Library, Winters Arts Building, Our Lady's Chapel, McCoy Hall, and Cassidy Technology Centre. The Jubilee Building was named in honor of Jubilee Year 2000.
 
The names of the College Houses also reflect Marianist heritage: Winters (green), Cassidy (red), McCoy (navy), McCluskey (yellow), Chaminade (sky blue).

Meanwhile, the Marianists were invited by a committee headed by Father Joseph Kealy to establish a boys' college in the southern Melbourne suburb of Frankston for years 7 to 12 (then forms 1 to 6). Marianist College opened in February 1973 with 166 boys and a staff of six under the direction of Brother Don Neff, SM. After preliminary discussions in 1976, it was announced in 1977 that Marianist College Frankston would merge with the adjacent Stella Maris College establishing a new regional, coeducational college. After consultation with the Archbishop of Melbourne, parents, and students, the College Board determined that "John Paul College" would be the school's official name. "John Paul College" was chosen to express the changes in the Catholic Church as a result of the Second Vatican Council (1962 –1965) under the leadership of popes John XXIII and Paul VI.

References

External links
 Society of Mary - Lincolnshire Wards
 Marianist International Home Page
 Marianist Vocation Site
 Santa Maria Foundation
 Society of Mary of Paris - Catholic Encyclopedia article
 University of Dayton - Guide to the Marianist magazine and Mary Today records
 University of Dayton - Guide to the Marianist memorial card collection

 
Marianists
Religious organizations established in 1817
Catholic Mariology
Catholic religious institutes established in the 19th century
1817 establishments in France